The 1985 Pacific Coast Athletic Association Baseball Championship Series, pitted the regular season division champions to determine the Pacific Coast Athletic Association baseball champion for the 1985 season.  and  met in a best of three series at Fresno State's Pete Beiden Field on May 17–18, 1985.

This was the league's first postseason championship event, and also the first year that the league and the West Coast Conference ended their partnership in baseball by dissolving their joint divisions. The PCAA is now known as the Big West Conference.

Fresno State claimed wins in the first two games to win the conference championship and the conference's automatic bid to the 1985 NCAA Division I baseball tournament.

Format and teams 
The division winners from the league's pair of four team divisions from the regular season met in the best of three series held at the home field of the division winner with the better conference record.

Game results

References 

Big West Conference Baseball Championship
Championship Series